Denistone West is a suburb in Northern Sydney, in the state of New South Wales, Australia. Denistone West is located 16 kilometres north-west of the Sydney central business district in the local government area of the City of Ryde. Denistone and Denistone East are separate suburbs; Denistone West was gazetted as a suburb in its own right on 5 February 1999.

Parks
Denistone West has several parks, including West Denistone Park, Lynn Park, Rutherford Park and Hibble Park. West Denistone Park was featured briefly in an episode of Season 43 of Play School on the ABC.

Transport 
Denistone railway station is situated in the suburb of Denistone, the station does not have disabled access. Denistone West is serviced by one Busways routes, 544, which connect to Eastwood, Auburn and Macquarie Park.

At the 2011 census, 18.5% of employed people travelled to work on public transport and 66.2% by motor vehicle.

Commercial
The commercial and retail hub of Denistone West is the West Denistone Shopping Centre. Major tenants include a vet & a hairdresser. An Australia Post post box is installed nearby the centre. The shopping area also includes a small car park.

Demographics 
At the 2016 census, Denistone West had a population of 933 people.

Age distribution  
 The distribution of ages in Denistone West was reasonably similar to the country as a whole. The median age was 39 years, compared to the national median of 38. Children aged under 15 years made up 22.8% of the population (the national average is 18.7%) and people aged 65 years and over made up 14.2% of the population (the national average is 15.8%).

Ethnic diversity  
 61.3% of people were born in Australia. The next most common country of birth was China at 11.9%. 56.9% of residents only spoke English at home. Other languages spoken at home included Mandarin at 12.8%.

Religion  
 The most common responses for religion were Catholic 29.4%, No Religion 26.2% and Anglican 13.8%.

Income  
 The median weekly household income in Denistone West was $2,128, compared to the national median of $1,438.	.

Housing  
 The great majority (82.5%) of private dwellings in Denistone West were family households. Stand-alone houses accounted for 97.9% of dwellings. The average household size was 3.1 people.

Media
Two free newspapers are home delivered weekly, the Northern District Times and The Weekly Times.

References

External links

  [CC-By-SA]

Suburbs of Sydney
City of Ryde
Denistone, New South Wales

ro:Denistone, New South Wales